Joanne Thompson is a Canadian politician who was elected to represent the riding of St. John's East in the House of Commons of Canada in the 2021 Canadian federal election. Prior to politics, Thompson was a Registered Nurse and worked in her family's jewelry business. Thompson is also the former executive director of the Gathering Place in St. John's, Newfoundland and Labrador.

Electoral history

References

External links

Living people
Liberal Party of Canada MPs
Members of the House of Commons of Canada from Newfoundland and Labrador
Politicians from St. John's, Newfoundland and Labrador
21st-century Canadian politicians
21st-century Canadian women politicians
Women members of the House of Commons of Canada
Year of birth missing (living people)